Costapex joliveti is a species of sea snail, a marine gastropod mollusk, in the family Costellariidae, the ribbed miters.

Description
Vexillum joliveti is a small, underwater sea snail, with a shell size of between 14–18 mm.

Distribution
This species occurs in the following locations:
 Bismarck Sea
 Papua New Guinea
 Philippines
 East China Sea.

References

 Poppe G.T. & Tagaro S.P. (2006) New Mitridae and Costellariidae from the Philippines and the East China Sea. Visaya 1(6): 76-89.

External links
 Fedosov A.E., Puillandre N., Herrmann M., Dgebuadze P. & Bouchet P. (2017). Phylogeny, systematics, and evolution of the family Costellariidae (Gastropoda: Neogastropoda). Zoological Journal of the Linnean Society. 179(3): 541-626

Costellariidae